Benue State is one of the North Central states in Nigeria with a population of about 4,253,641 in 2006 census. The state was created in 1976 among the seven states created at that time.The state derives its name from the Benue River which is the second largest river in Nigeria. The state borders Nasarawa State to the North; Taraba State to the East; Kogi State to the West; Enugu State to the South-West; Ebonyi and Cross-Rivers States to the South; and has an international border with Cameroon to the South-East. It is inhabited predominantly by the Tiv, Idoma and Igede. Minority ethnic groups in Benue are Etulo, Igbo, Jukun peoples etc. Its capital is Makurdi. Benue is a rich agricultural region; popularly grown crops include: oranges, mangoes, sweet potatoes, cassava, soya bean, guinea corn, flax, yams, sesame, rice, groundnuts, and Palm Tree.

Benue State as it exists today is a surviving legacy of an administrative entity that was carved out of the protectorate of northern Nigeria at the beginning of the twentieth century. The territory was initially known as Munshi Province until 1918 when the name of its dominant geographical feature, the 'Benue River' was adopted.

Benue State is named after the Benue River and was formed from the former Benue-Plateau State in 1976, along with Igala and some part of Kwara State. In 1991, some areas of Benue state (mostly the Igala  speaking area), along with areas in Kwara State, were carved out to become part of the new Kogi State. Igbo people are found in the boundary areas like the Obi, Oju etc., Local Government Areas. It is renowned as the "Heartbeat of the Middle Belt" and the "Entertainment Capital of the Middle Belt" north of the Niger River. Otukpo, the Idoma people's traditional and administrative capital, is also known as the Lion's Heart and the Land of the Brave.

Samuel Ortom is the governor and Benson Abounu is the deputy governor. Both were elected under the All Progressives Congress (APC) but defected to the Peoples Democratic Party (PDP) in 2018.

History

Population structure and distribution

Benue State, which is located in the North Central region of Nigeria, has a total population of 4,253,641 in 2006 census, with an average population density of 99 persons per km2. This makes Benue the 9th most populous state in Nigeria. However, the distribution of the population according to Local government areas shows marked duality.

There are areas of low population density, such as Guma, Gwer East, Ohimini, Katsina-Ala, Apa, Logo and Agatu, each with less than seventy persons per km2, while Vandeikya, Okpokwu, Ogbadibo, Obi and Gboko have densities ranging from 160 persons to 200 persons per km2 . Makurdi LGA has over 380 person per km2. The males are 49.8 percent of the total population while females constitute 50.2 per cent.

Settlement pattern and urbanization

Benue State region was depleted of its human population during the slave trade. It is largely rural, with scattered settlements mainly in tiny compounds or homesteads, whose population range from 630 people, most of whom are farmers.

Urbanization in Benue State did not predate the colonial era. The few towns established during colonial rule remained very small (less than 30,000 people) up to the creation of Benue State in 1976.

Benue towns can be categorised into three groups. The first group consists of those with a population of 80,000 to 500,000 people. These include Makurdi, the State Capital, Gboko and Otukpo the "headquarters" of the two dominant ethnic groups (125,944 and 88,958 people respectively). The second group comprises towns with a population of between 20,000 and 50,000 people and includes Katsina-Ala, Zaki-Biam, Ukum,  and Adikpo, Kwande. These are all local government headquarters. The third category comprises towns with a population of 10,000 to 19,000 people and includes Vandeikya, Lessel, Ihugh, Naka, Adoka, Aliade, Okpoga, Igumale, Oju, Utonkon, Ugbokolo, Wannune, Ugbokpo, Otukpa, Ugba and Korinya. Most of these towns are headquarters of recently created Local Government Areas and/or district headquarters or major market areas. Some of the headquarters of the newly created LGAs have populations of less than 10,000 people. Such places include Tse-Agberaba, Gbajimba, Buruku, Idekpa, Obagaji and Obarikeito. Apart from earth roads, schools, periodic markets and chemists (local drug stores), the rural areas are largely used for farming, relying on the urban centres for most of their urban needs.
Benue State has no problem of capital city primacy. Rather, three towns stand out very clearly as important urban centres which together account for more than 70 per cent of the social amenities provided in the state and almost all the industrial establishments. These centres are Makurdi, Gboko and Otukpo. They are amongst the oldest towns in the state and are growing at a much faster rate than the smaller younger towns.

Makurdi doubles as the capital of the state and the headquarters of Makurdi LGA, while Gboko, Otukpo and Oju double as the local government and ethnic headquarters (i.e. for Tiv, Idoma, and Igede). All the roads in the state radiate from these three centres.  As an administrative unit, Benue State was first created on 3 February 1976. It was one of the seven states created by the military administration headed by General Murtala Mohammed, which increased the number of states in the country from 13 to 19. In 1991, its boundaries were re-adjusted with the creation of Kogi State. The new Benue State of today has twenty-three (23) local government areas, which are administered by local government councils.

Geography 

Benue State lies within the lower river Benue trough in the middle belt region of Nigeria. Its geographic coordinates are longitude 7° 47' and 10° 0' East. Latitude 6° 25' and 8° 8' North; and shares boundaries with five other states namely: Nasarawa State to the north, Taraba State to the east, Cross-River State to the south, Enugu State to the south-west and Kogi State to the west. The state also shares a common boundary with the Nord-Ouest Province, claimed by both Ambazonia and the Republic of Cameroon on the south-east. Benue occupies a landmass of 34,059 square kilometres.

Geology
Based on Köppen climate classification, Benue State lies within the AW climate and experiences two distinct seasons, the Wet season and the Dry season. The rainy season lasts from April to October with annual rainfall in the range of 100-200mm. The dry season begins in November and ends in March. Temperatures fluctuate between 21 – 37 degrees Celsius in the year. The south-eastern part of the state adjoining the Obudu-Cameroun mountain range, however, has a cooler climate similar to that of Plateau State.

Much of Benue State falls within the Benue Valley/trough which is believed to be structurally developed. During the Tertiary and possibly the Interglacial periods of the Quaternary glaciation, the Benue and Niger Valleys, otherwise known as the Niger/Benue trough, were transgressed by the waters of the Atlantic Ocean. As a result, marine sediments form the dominant surface geology of much of Benue State.

Mineral resources
Benue State is blessed with abundant mineral resources. These resources are distributed in the Local Government Areas of the state. Of these mineral resources, only Limestone at Tse-Kucha near Gboko and Kaolinite at Otukpo are being commercially exploited. Other mineral deposits include Baryte, Gypsum, Feldspar, Wolframite, Kaolinite, mineral salts and Gemstone etc.

Natural resources

Benue State is the nation's acclaimed food basket because of its rich agricultural produce which include Yam, Rice, Beans, Cassava, Sweet-potato, Maize, Soybean, Sorghum, Millet, Sesame, cocoyam etc. The state accounts for over 70% of Nigeria's Soybean production.

Agriculture is the mainstay of the economy, engaging over 75% of the state farming population. The State also boasts of one of the longest stretches of river systems in the country with great potential for a viable fishing industry, dry season farming through irrigation and for an inland water highway.

The vegetation of the southern parts of the state is characterised by forests, which yield trees for timber and provide a suitable habitat for rare animals types and species. The state thus possesses potential for the development of viable forest and wildlife reserves.

Relief and drainage
The land is generally low lying (averaging 100m-250m) and gently undulating with occasional inselbergs, Knoll, Laterite etc. It is only at the boundary area with Cameroon, also Kwande and Oju Local Government Areas that hilly terrain with appreciable local relief is encountered. Here, the terrain is characterised by steep slopes, deep incised valleys and generally rugged relief. Elsewhere, gradients average less than 4°. River Benue is the dominant geographical feature in the state. It is one of the few large rivers in Nigeria. The Katsina-Ala is the largest tributary, while the smaller rivers include Mkomon, Amile, Duru, Loko Konshisha, Kpa, Okpokwu, Mu, Be, Aya, Apa Ogede and Ombi. The flood plains which are characterised by extensive swamps and ponds are good for dry season irrigated farming.

Though Benue State has high drainage density many of the streams are seasonal. Hence, there is an acute water shortage in the dry season in Local Government Areas such as Guma, Okpokwu, Ogbadibo, Gwer West (Naka, Nigeria) and Oju.

People and culture

The state is populated by several ethnic groups: Tiv, Idoma, Igede, Etulo, Abakpa, Jukun, Hausa, Igbo, Akweya and Nyifon. The Tiv are occupying 14 local government areas with the Etulo and Jukun, with the Idoma, Igede, Igbo, Akweya and Nyifon occupying nine.

Most of the Tiv people are farmers while the inhabitants of the river areas engage in fishing as their primary or important secondary occupation. The people of the state are famous for their cheerful and hospitable disposition as well as rich cultural heritage.

Traditional rulers
The Benue State Government accords high respect to traditional rulers in recognition of their role as custodians of culture and as agents of development. Also, their roles in enhancing peace and order at the grassroots level are also recognised. To enhance their contribution to the affairs of the state, government has established a three-tier traditional council system made up of Local Government Area Traditional Councils, Area Traditional Councils and the State Council of Chiefs with the Tor Tiv (Tiv King) as chairman.

The two Area Councils are the Tiv Traditional Council and the Idoma Traditional Council.  The former has the Tor Tiv (Tiv King) as chairman of all the traditional rulers from the Tiv dominant Local Government Areas, while the latter has the Och' Idoma (Idoma king) as the chairman of all the traditional rulers from the Idoma dominant Local Government Areas.

The State Council of Chiefs has the Tor Tiv, Orchivirigh Professor James Ortese Iorzua Ayatse (Tor Tiv V), with Och'Idoma and all second class Chiefs/Chairmen of the Local Government Traditional Council as members.

Culture

Benue State possesses a rich and diverse cultural heritage which finds expression in colourful cloths, exotic masquerades, supplicated music and dances. Traditional dances from Benue State have won acclaim at national and international cultural festivals. The most popular of these dances include Ingyough, Ange, Anchanakupa, Swange and Ogirinya among others.

The socio-religious festivals of the people, colourful dances, dresses and songs are also of tourist value. The Alekwu ancestral festival of the Idoma people, for instance, is an occasion when the local people believe their ancestors re-established contact with the living in the form of masquerades.

The Igede-Agba is a Yam Festival, marked every year in September by the Igede people of Oju and Obi local government areas. Among the Tiv, the Tiv Day, marriage ceremonies and dance competitions (e.g. Swange dance) are often very colourful. Kwagh-Hir is a very entertaining Tiv puppet show.

Social life in Benue State is also enriched by the availability of diverse recreational facilities. Apart from parks, beaches, dancing and masquerades mentioned above, the big hotels in Makurdi, Gboko and Otukpo are equipped with several indoor sporting facilities. There are golf clubs, the Makurdi Club, Railway Club, Police Club and Air Force Club, where, apart from the sale of drinks and snacks, various types of games are played.

There is a standard Arts Theatre, a modern Sports Complex which includes the Aper Aku Stadium, which has provisions for such games as tennis, basketball, volleyball and handball, an indoor sports hall and Olympic size swimming pool in Makurdi. Smaller stadia exist in Gboko (J. S. Tarka Stadium), Katsina-Ala, Adikpo, Vandeikya and Otukpo. The BCC Lawn Tennis tournament attracts players from all over the country. Benue State has three teams in the professional soccer ranks, Lobi Stars F.C. in Division One, BCC Lions FC in Division Two, Mark mentors as the basketball premier league team.

Languages 
Languages of Benue State listed by LGA:

Other languages spoken in the State include Etulo, Nyifon, Basa, Jukun (including Wannu), and Utugwang Irungene Afrike.

Igbo is also spoken in Border Areas.

Government 

The state is under the current administration of Samuel Ortom. The governor of Benue State leads its executive branch. They appoint heads of the state ministries. They also serve as the chief security officer of the state.

Cities and towns

Local Government Areas 
Benue State consists of twenty-three (23) Local Government Areas. They are:

Makurdi 
Makurdi, the state capital was established in the early twenties and gained prominence in 1927 when it became the headquarters of the then Benue Province.  Being a river port, it attracted the establishment of trading depots by companies such as United Africa Company of Nigeria and John Holt plc.  Its commercial status was further enhanced when the Railway Bridge was completed and opened in 1932.  In 1976, the town became the capital of Benue State and today, doubles as the headquarters of Makurdi Local Government Area.The town is divided by the River Benue into the north and south banks, which are connected by two bridges:  the railway bridge, which was built in 1932, and the new dual carriage bridge commissioned in 1978.

The southern part of the town is made up of several wards, including Central Ward, Old GRA, Ankpa Ward, Wadata Ward, High Level, Wurukum (Low Level), New GRA etc.  Important establishments and offices located here include the Government House, The State Secretariat, The Federal Secretariat, The Central Bank of Nigeria Regional headquarters, Commercial Banks, Telecommunication companies, Police Headquarters, Nigeria Prisons Service, Aper Aku Stadium, Nigeria Air force Base, Makurdi, The Makurdi Modern Market, the Federal Medical Centre, Nigeria Railway Station, Benue Printing and Publishing Company Limited, Radio Benue, Nigerian Television Authority (NTA), Nigerian Postal service, Benue Hotels Makurdi, Benue Plaza hotel, Benue State University, Benue State Breweries.

The North bank area of the town houses among other establishments, the Federal University of Agriculture, the Nigerian Army School of Military Engineering, the headquarters of the 72 Airborne Battalion, Akawe Torkula Polytechnic (ATP) and the State Headquarters of the Department of Customs and Excise.

Owing to its location in the valley of River Benue, Makurdi experiences warm temperatures most of the year.  The period from November to January, when the harmattan weather is experienced is, however, relatively cool.

Makurdi can be reached by air, rail, road and water as the airport is presently not functioning. The major northern route is the Makurdi – Lafia – Jos road.  The southern routes are Makurdi – Otukpo – Enugu and Makurdi – Yandev – Adikpo – Calabar roads.  Traffic from the west comes through Makurdi – (3) Naka – Adoka Ankpa (3) – Okene (1) roads and from the east through Makurdi – Yandev – Katsina Ala – Wukari roads.  The Makurdi Rail Bridge provides the only rail link between the northern and eastern parts of Nigeria.

The beaches of River Benue can be exploited to provide good sites for relaxation. The river itself provides tourist opportunities for boating, angling and swimming. The Makurdi Moratorium that houses a variety of animals including some rare species also serves as another feature of tourist attraction.

Economy

Agricultural production
Agriculture forms the backbone of the Benue State economy, engaging more than 70 per cent of the working population. This has made Benue the major source of food production in the Nation. It can still be developed because most of the modern techniques are not yet popular to 98% of Nigeria. Mechanization and plantation agriculture/agro-forestry are still at its infancy. Farm inputs such as fertilizers, improved seed, insecticides and other foreign methods are being increasingly used. However, cost and availability is still a challenge. Important cash crops include soybeans, rice, peanuts, mango varieties, citrus, etc.

Other cash crops include palm oil, melon, African pear, chili pepper, tomatoes etc. Food crops include Yam, Cassava, Sweet potato, Beans, Maize, Millet, Guinea corn, Vegetables etc. There is very little irrigation agriculture and techniques.

Animal production include, Cattle, Pork, Poultry and Goat but no dairy and dairy products yet.

The Zaki Ibiam International Yam Market is the biggest market for a single product in Nigeria.

Commerce and industry 
Banking services are available as all the banks in Nigeria have branches in the state with the Central Bank of Nigeria having its regional headquarters in Makurdi. Dangote Cement Company is a private company that operates within the state and provides a little employment to the people.

This is a rough estimated employment percentage in the state: 75% are farmers, 10% traders, 6% civil servants, 9% private.

Benue State has the capacity to support a wide range of industries using local agricultural and mineral resources although potentials are yet to be exploited. Private initiatives in commerce and industry, particularly by indigenes, is as also on a small scale and is limited to carpentry, shoe repairs and manufacturing, small scale rice mills, leather and plastic industries, weaving, printing, catering, block making, food processing, etc. Industry and commerce have been greatly retarded by the absence of capital funds, basic infrastructure and the frequent political changes.

Infrastructure and transportation
The location of Benue State in the centre of the country plus the presence of bridges on two large rivers, the Benue River and Katsina-Ala River, make the state a major cross-roads centre. Two major highways connect the Eastern States to the North and Northeast. The present government has shown commitment to the construction of roads within the state capital Makurdi and other major roads leading in and out of the state. The roads are in an excellent condition.

The Federal government is also remodelling and expanding the Makurdi Airport to become the largest agricultural cargo airport in the country.

The rivers Benue and Katsina-Ala only need to be dredged and a modern river port built at Makurdi, Turan, Buruku and Katsina-Ala to transport goods all over the nation since the state is at the middle of the country. Ships are sighted very occasionally offloading cargo for Benue company at the Abinsi jetty.

The eastern rail line connects Makurdi, Otukpo, Taraku, Utonkon and Igumale with the rest of the country. Altogether, about 180 km of rail line traverses the state.

Power supply
Electricity challenge in Benue is not different from every other regions in Nigeria,  places like markurdi, Otukpo and Gboko, to mention but few, enjoy at least 60% of power supply. However, private industries have other sources of power supply as plan (b).

Telecommunications
Benue has facilities for the GSM service companies operating in the Country.
The state also has 7 radio stations (Radio Benue, Joy FM, Harvest FM, Ashiwave FM, Sun Rays FM, Brothers' FM and Speed FM) and 2 television stations.

Tourism and recreation
Benue State possesses immense tourism potentials which are yet to be exploited. Since some of the tourist attractions are best selected by the tourist, Benue State in her bid to develop tourism embarked on infrastructural development necessary for the overall well-being of the tourist. The options are still opened to foreign investors.

The programme of road development, hotels, postal, telephone and Email services, electricity, potable water, recreational facilities and the general hospitality of the people will eventually open up the state to tourists. An amusement park and Zoo have been developed at Makurdi. There is a wild life park at lkwe where a conference hall and chalets have been built to serve tourists. Tourist attractions in the state may be grouped into natural scenic, historical monuments and festivals.

Natural Attractions in Benue State include hills and ranges such as Ikyogen, Abande, Ngokur, Mkar, Ushongo and Harga. There is a heavily wooded natural trench at Tse-Mker which is believed to be inhabited by dangerous creatures including Pythons. Gurgul is a waterfall on Katsina Ala River. The border stretch adjoining the Obudu/South Cameroon Plateau ranges features forests, dissected hills, Dykes, dozens of fast flowing streams and incised valleys. In the Dry season, the water level in both the Benue River and Katsina-Ala River falls, giving rise to sandy river beaches and clean shallow waters. The waters are used for recreational boating and swimming. At Orokam in Ogbadibo Local government areas, occurs the Enumabia Warm Spring. At Epwa-Ibilla, Andi-Ibilla, Uchenyum-Ibilla, Okochi-Uwokwu, Irachi-Uwokwu, Ette-Uda-Uwokwu, Odepa-Uwokwu, Igbegi-Ipinu-Uwokwu, Edde-Ibilla-Uwokwu, and Ohuma-Uwokwu of Oju, are springs of clean water. There are masses of unusually tall trees in the deep valleys and on the pretty steep highlands, which are all however inhabited.

Historical monuments in the state include the Royal Niger Company Trading Stores at Makurdi and Gbileve near Katsina-Ala; the tombs of the first Dutch missionaries at Harga and Sai in Katsina-Ala Local Government Areas; the tombs of the legendary politician, Mr. J. S. Tarka and past three Tor Tiv in Gboko town; and the trench fortifications in Turan district of Kwande local government areas which were dug by the Tiv to ward off Chamba invasions in the 19th century.

At Utonkon, is a thick forest with tall giant trees, the centre of which used to serve as a slave trade market, but is now the site of shrines and a periodic market. Swem is a shrine site at the foot of the Cameroon range in Kwande local government area from where the Tivs were said to have originated.

Education 
Higher education institutions in Benue State include;

 Akawe Torkula Polytechnic, ATP, Makurdi.
 Benue State Polytechnic, Ugbokolo
 Benue State University, Makurdi
College of Education, Katsina-Ala  
 Joseph Sarwuan Tarka Uniniversity ( JOSTUM), Makurdi
 University of Mkar

Notable people 

Aper Aku
George Akume
Daniel Amokachi
David Mark
Lawrence Onoja
Samuel Ortom
Gabriel Suswam

References

External links
 Official Benue State website

 
States of Nigeria
States and territories established in 1976
Library of Congress Africa Collection related
Benue River